Shicheng station may refer to:

 Shicheng railway station (Taiwan), in Toucheng Township, Yilan County, Taiwan
 , in Dandong, Liaoning Province, China
 Shicheng station (Suzhou Rail Transit), a metro station on Line 5 of Suzhou Rail Transit, in Suzhou, Jiangsu Province, China